Professor Amat al-Razzak Hammed is the former Minister for social affairs of Yemen. She has proposed adoption of a government policy to punish fathers who force their daughters into child marriages.

References

Living people
Women government ministers of Yemen
Child marriage in Yemen
Year of birth missing (living people)
Place of birth missing (living people)
21st-century Yemeni politicians
21st-century Yemeni women politicians
Mujawar Cabinet
Basindawa Cabinet